Kerwhizz (strapline: The Quiz with added Whizz) is a live-action animated British children's television game show which originally aired on CBeebies between 2008 and 2011. The series uses a mix of CGI and Live action, and is targeted towards four to six-year-olds.

Summary
The show is moderated and presented by Kerwhizzitor (Jacob Scipio), the only regular live-action character. Three teams of two CGI characters, each comprising a human child racer and a part-living, part-mechanical animal pet, must answer five rounds of questions, each featuring a regular 2D animated animal character, to win a choice of pod mod for their respective racing pods. In addition, one of the five rounds offer the chance to win a mystery pod mod. Each pod mod, and mystery mod is an unconventional accessory that may or may not give its user a better chance of winning the race. The teams are cheered on by three groups of live-action children dressed in the teams' colours and waving team flags, the teams also score points focused on how many questions they answered correctly.

All of the questions are multiple-choice, with the answers colour-coded red, green, yellow or blue (not coincidentally, these are the standard colours of the function buttons on TV remote controls). Once the question rounds are complete, the teams choose their pod mods, and then the teams' pods are assembled and built around them and their respective pod mods are installed, fitted and added to their pods. The pods are then raised through the roof of the studio into the CGI race world. Each race world is a themed racing environment (the questions usually include clues to the theme) containing three, or occasionally four, zones, and each story and race comprises two, or occasionally three laps (except in "The Deserted Desert Dash", which is a novelty race with no set route and a hidden finish line). All of the teams are likely to encounter unexpected setbacks and opportunities along the way, making the outcome of each race unpredictable, each episode ends with the winner of each race getting revealed, then some of the teams do activities based on the theme, since they didn't race, since the Kerwhizzitor saw what happened to some of the teams.

Characters

Questionmaster
 Kerwhizzitor (created and played by Jacob Scipio) moderates the quiz, asks the questions, makes bad puns and rhymes based on the theme and tries to keep the teams in order. In the race world and the story world sequences Kerwhizzitor commentates.

Contestants
 Team Ninki comprises Ninki (voiced by Kriselle Basilio), a dark-skinned 10-year old girl with bunches, a Mid-European accent and a singing voice that is commonly said to be "terrible" (although while introducing her team at the beginning of every episode she sings well); and Pip, a green-furred creature somewhat resembling a Scottish terrier with an extendable metal neck. Pip can't speak, but can often shape his barks and growls into an approximation of words. Despite this Ninki sometimes fails to hear him when he gets a question wrong and offers her own right answer instead, causing him to growl in frustration. Team colour: yellow. Team logo: yellow star.
 Team Twist compromises Twist (voiced by Alex Velleman) a highly confident, desperate to be cool, blond 12-year old boy with pale skin and a fixation for style; and Snout (voiced by Jermaine Woods), not credited on series 2 for unknown reasons) who resembles an orange-furred, two-legged woolly mammoth with a plastic trunk, and has a fixation of his own, with sprouts. In the episode "Planet Snout" the eponymous planet is revealed to be his homeworld and the origin of his vegetable obsession. It is also revealed that Snout has two nephews, Rocko and Ricko. Team colour: blue. Team logo: blue spiral.
 Team Kit comprises Kit (voiced by Telka Donyai), a fair-skinned 11-year old girl with blue hair who is very brainy and good at thinking around problems. Though her confidence in her abilities is as great as Twist's, occasionally causing some girl-boy rivalry between them; and Kaboodle (voiced by Yasmin Garrad), who is basically a furry ball with a face, two conical plastic ears/antennae, and a springy conical plastic leg. She appears to be less mature than the other racers and often requires emotional support from Kit. She is able to electrify anything after bouncing for long enough. Team colour: pink. Team logo: pink lightning bolt.

Question hosts
These characters appear in the flash-animated question sequences. None of them speak, since the questions are all read by the Kerwhizzitor. In many episodes they, or characters based on their designs, also appear in CGI form in the race world sequences, where they are much bigger than the human contestants.
 Natterjack the Toad presents two questions per episode based on picture recognition. A typical question might involve the teams identifying one of four pictures that is identical to one that Natterjack has drawn.
 Burping Hurbert the Burpasaur presents one question based on visual memory. This typically involves Hurbert eating one of several objects and the teams having to choose which one it was from four alternatives.
 King Pong the Skunk presents "Hunt That Skunk", in which he hides in or behind four objects in rapid succession. Pip, Snout, and Kaboodle have to decide which object was his last hiding place in order to win the Mystery Mod. King Pong's appearance is always heralded by a smelly green vapour. Occasionally he is replaced by his relatives, such as the pirate Long Pong Silver (who smells even worse), or by Queen Pong or Princess Pong (who both smell very nice and produce fragrant pink vapour).
 Kat Kool the Cat presents "Kat Kool's Sound Round", one question based on auditory memory. Typically Kat Kool or his band will play a tune, and the teams must then choose which of four alternative tunes matches.

Episodes

In other languages
Polish: Kwizerr
Dutch (Flanders): Kwiskwat
Hebrew: Hikon, Chidon, Hop! (In this version, the Kerwhizzitor is and called Ron Chidon and played by Rami Tzion)
Hungarian: Csűrcsavarosdi
Spanish:  Kerwhizz
Arabic [Kirwiz]

Reception
British psychologist Aric Sigman refers to Kerwhizz as a perfect example of what television makers claim is educational, despite his insistence to the contrary. Sigman goes on to say that "the phrase 'educational television' was, of course, invented by people who make television", "to me it's an oxymoron.".

Lawsuit
In 2011, cartoonist Michael Mitchell sued the BBC and CBeebies, claiming that Kerwhizz's human CGI characters were based on his own designs for a proposed series called The Bounce Bunch. The BBC and CBeebies denied these claims. In the England and Wales Patents County Court in December 2011, His Honour Judge Birss, QC found that the Kerwhizz characters did not infringe Mr Mitchell's copyright.

References

External links
 

2000s British animated television series
2010s British animated television series
2000s British children's television series
2010s British children's television series
2000s preschool education television series
2010s preschool education television series
2008 British television series debuts
2011 British television series endings
Animated preschool education television series
Animated television series about children
BBC children's television shows
British children's game shows
British children's animated television shows
British preschool education television series
British television series with live action and animation
CBeebies
English-language television shows
Animated television series about auto racing